Nereocystis (Greek, 'mermaid's bladder') is a monotypic genus of subtidal kelp containing the species Nereocystis luetkeana. Some English names include edible kelp, bull kelp, bullwhip kelp, ribbon kelp,  bladder wrack, and variations of these names. Due to the English name, bull kelp can be confused with southern bull kelps, which are found in the Southern Hemisphere. Nereocystis luetkeana forms thick beds on subtidal rocks, and is an important part of kelp forests.

Etymology
The species Nereocystis luetkeana was named (as Fucus luetkeanus) after the German-Russian explorer Fyodor Petrovich Litke (also spelled Lütke) by Mertens.  The species was renamed in a description by Postels and Ruprecht.

Description

It is usually annual, sometimes persisting up to 18 months. Nereocystis is the only kelp which will drop spore patches, so that the right concentration of spores lands near the parent's holdfast.

Reproductive patches (sori) develop on the blades and drop to the seafloor at maturity.

Distribution

The species is common along the Pacific Coast of North America, from Southern California to the Aleutian Islands, Alaska.  However, drift individuals disperse with ocean currents further south into northwest Baja California, Mexico.

This annual kelp grows on rock from the low intertidal to subtidal zones; it prefers semi-exposed habitats or high-current areas. Offshore beds can persist for one to many years, usually in deeper water than Eualaria or Macrocystis, where they co-occur.

References

Further reading

External links
 
 Nereocystis luetkeana (K.Mertens) Postels & Ruprecht on Algaebase
 Decews Guide

Laminariaceae
Flora of the Pacific
Marine biota of North America
Flora of Alaska
Flora of California
Flora of the West Coast of the United States
Edible algae
Laminariales genera
Monotypic brown algae genera
Flora without expected TNC conservation status